Upshall may refer to:

People 
Eric Upshall (born 1951), Canadian politician
Scottie Upshall (born 1983), Canadian ice hockey player

Places 
Upshall Station, Newfoundland and Labrador locality